Omiodes indicata, the bean-leaf webworm moth or soybean leaf folder, is a species of moth of the family Crambidae. It is found from Florida to Texas, the West Indies and Mexico to South America, Cameroon, the Comoros, the Democratic Republic of Congo, La Réunion, Madagascar, Mauritius, Nigeria, Saudi Arabia, the Seychelles, South Africa, India, Borneo and Australia (Queensland).

The wingspan is about 20 mm.

References

Moths described in 1775
indicata
Lepidoptera of Cameroon
Moths of Madagascar
Lepidoptera of the Democratic Republic of the Congo
Lepidoptera of West Africa
Moths of the Comoros
Moths of Mauritius
Moths of Seychelles
Moths of Réunion
Moths of Africa
Taxa named by Johan Christian Fabricius